Simon Marshall may refer to:

 Simon Marshall (jockey), Australian former jockey and media personality
 Simon Marshall (cricketer) (born 1982), English cricketer